Sir Denis Follows, CBE (13 April 1908 – 17 September 1983) was a British sports administrator. Between 1962 and 1973 he was Secretary of the Football Association (FA) and from 1977 was Chairman of the British Olympic Association. During his tenure as BOA Chairman, he was instrumental in ensuring that British competitors were able to choose whether or not to compete at the 1980 Moscow Olympics. The BOA had come under government pressure to withdraw the team in protest at the Soviet invasion of Afghanistan. Follows led the party to Moscow as Team Commandant.

Follows was educated at the universities of London and Nottingham, and was President of the National Union of Students between 1931 and 1933. Having been appointed Member of the Order of the British Empire (MBE) in the 1950 Birthday Honours for his work as Secretary of the British Airline Pilots Association, Follows was promoted to Commander of the Order of the British Empire (CBE) in the 1967 New Year Honours, and knighted in the 1978 Birthday Honours for services to sport.

In January 1970, while serving as the FA secretary, Follows wrote to the Women's Football Association (WFA) to inform them that the 1921 ban on women's football had been rescinded. He was later appointed an honorary life vice president of the WFA.

References

Bibliography

 

1908 births
1983 deaths
Presidents of the National Union of Students (United Kingdom)
Alumni of the University of London
Alumni of the University of Nottingham
The Football Association
Commanders of the Order of the British Empire
Knights Bachelor
People in sports awarded knighthoods
Association football people awarded knighthoods